There Is a Party is the second studio album released by the Swiss singer-songwriter DJ BoBo. It was released on 21 October 1994 through the Fresh Music, Metrovynil as well as EAMS Lesser record labels on compact disc, 12-inch gramophone record and music cassette formats. The album, which belongs to the musical genre of electronic music was later re-released in 1995 via BMG Records and enjoyed massive commercial success worldwide.

Critical reception
Pan-European magazine Music & Media wrote, "More of the same or...? Well, Let The Dream Come True continues the Euro style of the Swiss DJ's previous hits. Most of the set here is made according to that winning formula, whereby Freedom is a gambler's best bet. A truly new musical direction is distinct by the reggae-tinged title track. We hear a guitar and it's like the Boney M girls are looking over Bobo's shoulders. One key to Euro's future is in Bobo's hands."

Charts

Weekly charts

Year-end charts

Certifications

References

1994 albums
DJ BoBo albums